Oliver Township may refer to:

 Oliver Township, Scott County, Arkansas, in Scott County, Arkansas
 Oliver Township, Huron County, Michigan
 Oliver Township, Kalkaska County, Michigan
 Oliver Township, Taney County, Missouri
 Oliver Township, Williams County, North Dakota, in Williams County, North Dakota
 Oliver Township, Adams County, Ohio
 Oliver Township, Perry County, Pennsylvania
 Oliver Township, Mifflin County, Pennsylvania
 Oliver Township, Jefferson County, Pennsylvania

Township name disambiguation pages